The 1997 RTHK Top 10 Gold Songs Awards was held in 1997 for the 1996 music season.

Top 10 song awards
The top 10 songs (十大中文金曲) of 1997 are as follows.

Other awards

References
 RTHK top 10 gold song awards 1997

RTHK Top 10 Gold Songs Awards
Rthk Top 10 Gold Songs Awards, 1997
Rthk Top 10 Gold Songs Awards, 1997